The 1955 NBA draft was the ninth annual draft of the National Basketball Association (NBA). The draft was held on April 13, 1955, before the 1955–56 season. In this draft, eight remaining NBA teams took turns selecting amateur U.S. college basketball players. In each round, the teams select in reverse order of their win–loss record in the previous season. The Milwaukee Hawks participated in the draft, but relocated to St. Louis, Missouri, and became the St. Louis Hawks prior to the start of the season. The draft consisted of 15 rounds comprising 96 players selected.

Draft selections and draftee career notes 
Dick Ricketts from Duquesne University was selected first overall by the Milwaukee Hawks. Second pick of the draft, Maurice Stokes from Saint Francis University won the Rookie of the Year Award. Dick Garmaker and Tom Gola were selected before the draft as Minneapolis Lakers' and Philadelphia Warriors' territorial picks respectively. Three players from this draft, Maurice Stokes, Tom Gola, and Jack Twyman, have been inducted to the Basketball Hall of Fame. K. C. Jones, who was selected by the Minneapolis Lakers in the later rounds, has also been inducted to the Basketball Hall of Fame, although he did not enter the league immediately after the draft. In the 1956 draft, he was selected in the second round by the Boston Celtics, with whom he played for in his whole career.

Key

Draft

Other picks 
The following list includes other draft picks who have appeared in at least one NBA game.

Notable undrafted players 

These players were not selected in the 1955 NBA draft, but played at least one game in the NBA.

See also
 List of first overall NBA draft picks

References 
General

Specific

External links 
NBA.com
NBA.com: NBA Draft History

Draft
National Basketball Association draft
NBA draft
NBA draft
Basketball in New York City
Sporting events in New York City